Claude Carliez (10 January 1925 – 17 May 2015) was a French master at arms in classical fencing who became a period and fencing advisor for French films. He then became a stunt performer, stunt coordinator, special effects person, and film director. He worked with such legends of the French cinema as Jean Marais, Louis de Funès, Gérard Oury and Jean-Paul Belmondo. He was a President of the Academie d'Armes de France and the first President of the French Stuntman's Union.

Biography
The son of a dancing expert, he was born in Nancy in 1925. At 18 he entered the School 

He started  Fencing Joinville-le-Pont at the age of 18, becoming a Master at Fencing  at 21. Due to the proximity of the school to film studios, Claude became a technical advisor on historic weapons and costumes for several films.

In 1959 Claude appeared in the swashbuckler film Le Bossu, starring Jean Marais and directed by André Hunebelle, who would both propel his film career forwards. Hunebelle placed him in charge of all the stunts for his next film Le Capitan, and he advanced to doing stunts for The Battle of Austerlitz.

Carliez worked not only on historical films, but also on contemporary films such as Hunebelle's Fantômas series. He became the stunt arranger to André Hunebelle's OSS 117 film series in a manner similar to Bob Simmons of the James Bond films.  When the James Bond film Moonraker was produced in France and Brazil, Claude staged many of the stunts for the film.

In 1969 Jean Marais suggested that with all his experience Claude direct him in Le Paria (1969).

He died on 17 May 2015.

Filmography

References

External links

French film directors
1933 births
2015 deaths
French stunt performers
French male fencers